Stephen Edmund Verney (17 April 1919 – 9 November 2009) was the second Bishop of Repton from 1977 to 1985; and from then on an honorary assistant bishop within the Diocese of Oxford. Toward the end of WWII Verney worked as an undercover political operative in occupied Crete.

The son of Sir Harry Verney, 4th Baronet, he was born on 17 April 1919 and educated at Harrow and Balliol College, Oxford. 

At the beginning of World War Two, as a conscientious objector, he served with a Friends Ambulance unit but later became a Royal Army Service Corps private in Cairo. Here as an Oxford classicist he was recruited into the Political Operations Executive and sent into occupied Crete in August 1944, working undercover from Chania, with the objective of lowering German morale. His role principally involved identifying and approaching dissatisfied German soldiers. With the assistance of a German sergeant major, in love with a Cretan Woman,  he printed and distributed “Kreta Post” a subtle propaganda paper, in German, from a cave outside Chania.

Following the fall of Mussolini he slipped into the camp of an Italian battalion forced by the Germans to fight on and negotiated with the Colonel the surrender of the entire battalion.

Following the German surrender of Crete he set up an exhibition of photographs received from recently liberated concentration camps. These were not believed by the still armed German soldiers and a grenade was left under his car.

In 1947 he married Priscilla Schwerdt; he was made deacon at Michaelmas 1950 (1 October), by Russell Barry, Bishop of Southwell, at Southwell Minster, and ordained priest (presumably the next Michaelmas). He began his career with a curacy at Gedling after which he was: Priest in charge of St Francis Clifton, Nottingham; Vicar of Leamington Hastings; Diocesan Missioner for the Diocese of Coventry then finally, before his appointment to the episcopate, a canon residentiary at Windsor. His first wife died in 1974 and seven years later Verney became the first bishop to marry a divorced woman. He was consecrated a bishop on 31 March 1977, by Donald Coggan, Archbishop of Canterbury at Westminster Abbey. After 8 years as the suffragan bishop in the Diocese of Derby, he retired to Blewbury in 1985.

Verney was active in an organisation called The New Era Centre, which was founded by Dr Fred Blum in 1967. In 1969, Blum met Verney at a conference in Coventry where Verney was doing reconciliation work. They became friends, "like brothers", and Verney became a trustee and significant supporter and contributor to the creation and work of The New Era Centre, which became a registered charity on 20 December 1979. Verney was a well-connected individual, and frequently communicated with the politician Roy Jenkins. The residential community of The New Era Centre in The Abbey, Sutton Courtenay, which was purchased in 1980, was dedicated on 4 October 1981 as a space to explore and work towards the synthesis of Christianity and more contemporary understandings of societal transformation. In 1984, after The Abbey was improved to a habitable state, the first two resident community members moved in. Stephen Verney extensively discussed, and believed in, the role Buddhist practice and philosophy could play in increasing connectivity with a Christian deity, and it was this belief which led many of The New Era Centre's early pursuits.

Works
Fire in Coventry (Hodder & Stoughton 1964, new edition published by The Diocese of Coventry 2010)
Water into Wine (London: Fount Paperbacks, 1985)

Notes

External links
Stephen Edmund Verney's obituary
The Right Rev Stephen Verney obituary

1919 births
2009 deaths
Royal Army Service Corps soldiers
Stephen
People educated at Harrow School
Alumni of Balliol College, Oxford
Members of the Order of the British Empire
Bishops of Repton
British Army personnel of World War II
20th-century Church of England bishops
Younger sons of baronets
Intelligence Corps officers
Canons of Windsor
People from Blewbury